Kawęczyn  is a village in Turek County, Greater Poland Voivodeship, in west-central Poland. It is the seat of the gmina (administrative district) called Gmina Kawęczyn.

References

Villages in Turek County